Cenchrus distichophyllus is a grass species native to Cuba.

Cenchrus distichophyllus is a perennial herb, forming clumps.

References

distichophyllus
Endemic flora of Cuba
Grasses of North America